National Route 463 is a national highway of Japan connecting Koshigaya, Saitama and Iruma, Saitama in Japan, with a total length of 43.8 km (27.22 mi).

References

National highways in Japan
Roads in Saitama Prefecture